In mathematics, a Zorn ring is an alternative ring in which for every non-nilpotent x there exists an element y such that xy is a non-zero idempotent .  named them after Max August Zorn, who studied a similar condition in .

For associative rings, the definition of Zorn ring can be restated as follows:  the Jacobson radical J(R) is a nil ideal and every right ideal of R which is not contained in J(R) contains a nonzero idempotent.  Replacing "right ideal" with "left ideal" yields an equivalent definition.  Left or right Artinian rings, left or right perfect rings, semiprimary rings and von Neumann regular rings are all examples of associative Zorn rings.

References

Non-associative algebras
Ring theory